Raja Rani Ko Chahiye Pasina is a 1978 Bollywood film directed by Sulabha Deshpande. The film stars Sushant Ray, Durga, Jasraj.

External links
 

1978 films
1970s Hindi-language films